Nicholas Richard Bailey (born 5 July 1971 in Birmingham) is a British actor, best known for his role as Anthony Trueman in the British soap opera EastEnders. He also participated in the 2006 series of ITV's Soapstar Superstar. He attended Old Swinford Hospital School, Stourbridge and Cherry Orchard, Birmingham.

Bailey has also performed in numerous theatre productions, with roles including, Macduff in Macbeth at The Mercury Theatre, Colchester, October 2014; Robert Mugabe's security officer Gabriel in Breakfast with Mugabe, and The Duke of Burgundy in Richard Eyre's production of King Lear at the National Theatre, London. In 2012, Bailey joined the cast of BBC Radio 4 soap opera The Archers as Carl.

TV and film roles
 House of Anubis .... Police Officer (2011)
 Doctors .... Paramedic / ... (3 episodes, 2001–09)
 Beautiful People (UK TV series) .... First Policeman (1 episode, 2008)
 Manchester Passion (2006) (TV) .... Peter
 EastEnders .... Dr. Anthony Trueman / ... (229 episodes, 2000–05, 2014)
 Holby City .... Neil Morton (1 episode, 2004)
 Comic Relief 2003: The Big Hair Do (2003) (TV) .... Dr. Anthony Trueman
 Sex 'n' Death .... (1999) (TV) .... Tony, the Great Fandango
 Casualty .... Felix (2 episodes, 1998–99)
 Heartburn Hotel .... Prince Ekoku (2 episodes, 1998)
 Performance .... Burgundy (1 episode, 1998)
 Coronation Street .... Lee Middleton (5 episodes, 1996–97)
 Accused .... Jack Vincent (7 episodes, 1996)
 I.D. (1995) .... Mickey
 The Bill .... Joseph Tucker (1 episode, 1994)
 London's Burning ..... Martin
(1 episode, 1994)
 Jolly a Man for All Seasons (1994) (TV) (as Nick Bailey) .... Classic FM DJ

Other TV appearances

 Walter Tull: Forgotten Hero (2008) (TV) .... Himself
 No. 1 Soap Fan (2007) (TV) .... Himself
 Most Shocking Celebrity Moments of the 21st Century (2007) (TV) .... Himself
 Another Audience with Shirley Bassey (2006) (TV) .... Himself – Audience Member
 Soapstar Superstar .... Himself – Audience Member / ... (9 episodes, 2006)
 This Morning .... Himself (3 episodes, 2006)
 Soapstar Superstar (2006) TV series .... Himself (unknown episodes)
 Byker Grove .... Himself (1 episode, 2005)
 The Importance of Being Famous (2003) (TV) .... Himself
 Loose Women .... Himself (1 episode, 2003)
 Liquid News .... Himself (2 episodes, 2001–03)
 It's Only TV...But I Like It .... Himself (1 episode, 2002)
 Sport Relief .... (2002) (TV) .... Himself
 2002 Top of the Pops Awards (2002) (TV) .... Himself – Presenter
 EastEnders Revealed .... Himself (1 episode, 2002)

References

External links

BBC Eastenders Backstage Bio of Nicholas Bailey

1971 births
English people of Ugandan descent
English male radio actors
English male soap opera actors
Black British male actors
People educated at Old Swinford Hospital
Living people